Richman Township is a township in Wayne County, Iowa, USA.

History
Richman Township was named for M. H. Richman, a pioneer settler.

References

Townships in Wayne County, Iowa
Townships in Iowa